Gymnochanda is a genus of fishes in the family Ambassidae, the Asiatic glassfishes. They are native to turbid fresh water habitats near peat or swamp forests in Peninsular Malaysia, Borneo, Sumatra and Belitung Island.

They are among the smallest members of the family, reaching a maximum standard length of  depending on the exact species involved. They have no scales and are transparent, revealing the silvery sheen of the peritoneum lining the abdominal cavity. They are sexually dimorphic, with males bearing longer fins and brighter colors than females.

Species
There are 5 species in the genus:

 Gymnochanda filamentosa Fraser-Brunner, 1955
 Gymnochanda flamea T. R. Roberts, 1995
 Gymnochanda limi Kottelat, 1995
 Gymnochanda ploegi H. H. Tan & K. K. P. Lim, 2014
 Gymnochanda verae H. H. Tan & K. K. P. Lim, 2011

References

Ambassidae
Taxa named by Alec Fraser-Brunner
Freshwater fish genera